William Cooke (18 December 1682 – 1709), of Highnam Court, near Gloucester, was an English Whig politician who sat in the English and British House of Commons from 1705 to 1709.

Cooke was the second but eldest surviving son  of Edward Cooke of Highnam, Gloucestershire and his wife Mary Newborough, daughter of Rowland Newborough of Berkley, Somerset. His grandfather, William Cooke, was also MP for Gloucester. He was admitted at Middle Temple in 1702. In 1705 he became Freeman of Gloucester.

Cooke was returned as a Whig   Member of Parliament (MP)  for Gloucester at the 1705 English general election. He voted  for the Court candidate for Speaker on 25 October 1705 and  supported the Court on the 'place clause' in the regency bill on 18 February 1706. In 1707, he was said to be pressing hard for his uncle to be appointed Dean of Gloucester, but was unsuccessful.  He was returned as MP for Gloucester again at the 1708 British general election.

Cooke died unmarried in June 1709, aged 26, predeceasing his father.

References

1682 births
1709 deaths
People from Gloucester
Members of the Parliament of England (pre-1707) for Gloucester
Members of the Parliament of Great Britain for English constituencies
English MPs 1705–1707
British MPs 1707–1708
British MPs 1708–1710
Members of the Middle Temple